Main Naahin Maakhan Khaayo is a popular Indian bhajan, a Hindu devotional song written by 15th-century mystic-poet, Surdas set to Raga Ramkali. It is written in Braj Bhasha, a dialect of Hindi native to Braja, and epitomizes Vātsalya (Parental Love) Rasa describing an episode from the lilas of Krishna.

Popular culture 
The bhajan was popularised by singers like Lata Mangeshkar, Anup Jalota and Kundan Lal Saigal. Song was also included in B.R. Chopra's popular television series Mahabharat and it was performed by Nitin Mukesh.

Context
Lord Krishna says to his mother that he did not steal the butter. A very popular bhajan, the naughty child Krishna was caught with
freshly churned butter by his mother Yashoda, with some still on his face. He claims:

O Mother mine, believe me, I have not eaten the butter
These friends of mine, out of sheer spite, spread some butter on my face

References

Hindi songs
Hindi poetry
15th-century poems
Bhakti movement
Krishna
Lata Mangeshkar songs